"New Schoolgirl" is the debut single album by South Korean girl group, After School

Track listing

References

External links
 Official website

2009 songs
After School (band) songs
Korean-language songs
Hybe Corporation singles